David Beal (born 17 July 1966) played first-class and List A cricket for Somerset County Cricket Club in the 1991 season. He was born at Butleigh, Somerset.

Beal was a lower-order right-handed batsman and a right-arm medium-pace bowler who took a lot of wickets in club cricket for the Morlands Cricket Club at Glastonbury. He played three first-class matches and six one-day games for Somerset in 1991, having appeared for Somerset's second eleven since 1984. He made little impression in these matches, scoring just one run in both first-class and List A games, and achieving his best bowling in either form of cricket on his debut, in the List A match against Surrey at The Oval, when he took two wickets for 40 runs in his eight overs. He picked up a back injury in a mid-season one-day match against Middlesex and though he returned to the side late in the season, he did not play for any Somerset side after 1991.

References

1966 births
Living people
English cricketers
Somerset cricketers
Cricketers from Somerset